The 2019 Malaysia FA Cup Final was the 30th final of the Malaysia FA Cup, the Malaysia football cup competition.

Background 
The final was played on 27 July 2019 at Bukit Jalil National Stadium.

Route to the final 

Note: In all results below, the score of the finalist is given first.

Perak

Kedah

Ticket allocation 
Each club received an allocation of 80,000 tickets; 30,750 tickets for Perak, 30,750 tickets for Kedah and 18,500 tickets for online purchase.

Rules
The final are played as a single match. If tied after regulation, extra time and, if necessary, penalty shoot-out would be used to decide the winner.

Match

Details

References

Final
FA Final